The Engadin Skimarathon is an annual cross-country skiing race (ski marathon) held on the second Sunday of March in the upper Engadine valley (Switzerland), between Maloja and S-chanf. It debuted in 1969 and has been a part of Worldloppet as long as Worldloppet has existed. It is one of the major cross-country skiing events in the Alps. Between 11,000 and 14,200 skiers participate each year. The total distance covered is 42 km, although it is also possible to complete the half-marathon of 21 km (finishing in Pontresina) or the 17 km Women's Race (Samedan to S-chanf) . While it is a freestyle race, there are separate tracks for skiers practicing classic style for all but the narrowest parts of the race. Participation is open to anyone from the age of 16, and no licence is required to sign up.

The track record of 1:16:10h was set by Hervé Balland in 1994. In the same year, Silvia Honegger completed the race with the female track record of 1:22:08. As the race was extended by 2 km in 1998 to match the distance of a full marathon and the track was changed slightly in the Stazerwald section, resulting in a more difficult topography, longer racetimes are now standard.

The track then leads over both Lake Sils and Lake Silvaplana (which are frozen at this time of year). After passing St. Moritz there is a forested climb in the Stazerwald. The proceeding descent to Pontresina is regarded by many as the most spectacular part of the race for spectators, due to the high number of falls and crashes by skiers.

Winners

See also
Skiing and skiing topics

References

External links
 - Cancelation March 2020 - Due to Coronavirus
Engadin Skimarathon - official site
Engadin Skimarathon (en) - official site (in English)
Course map - from the official race site
Engadin Skimarathon - view track on Google Maps
Maloja Palace Hotel - official site

International sports competitions hosted by Switzerland
Cross-country skiing competitions in Switzerland
Recurring sporting events established in 1969
1969 establishments in Switzerland
March sporting events